Thorskog House is a manor house in Bohuslän, Sweden. It is located in Lilla Edet Municipality.
It was built in 1892 in accordance with the plans of architect Carl Fahlström  (1854-1920).  

Thorskogs slott operates as a hotel and is open to the public with forty furnished rooms and restaurant facilities. Thorskogs slott was the location for the 2009 and 2010 season of the SVT show Stjärnorna på slottet.

References

External links
 

Hotels in Sweden
Manor houses in Sweden
Hotel buildings completed in 1892
Buildings and structures in Bohuslän